Lorenzo Costa was an Italian racing cyclist. He rode in the 1922 Tour de France.

References

Italian male cyclists

Year of birth missing
Year of death missing
Date of birth unknown
Date of death unknown
Place of birth missing